Luis de los Santos (November 1, 1977 in Santo Domingo, Dominican Republic), is a former Major League Baseball pitcher who played in . He  played for the Tampa Bay Devil Rays.

External links

1977 births
Living people
Columbus Clippers players
Dominican Republic expatriate baseball players in South Korea
Dominican Republic expatriate baseball players in the United States
Durham Bulls players
Greensboro Bats players
Gulf Coast Yankees players
Kia Tigers players

Major League Baseball pitchers
Major League Baseball players from the Dominican Republic
Minor league baseball coaches
Norwich Navigators players
Oneonta Yankees players
Tampa Bay Devil Rays players
Tampa Yankees players